Epicopistis is a genus of moths in the Carposinidae family. It contains the single species Epicopistis pleurospila, which is found in Australia, where it has been recorded from Queensland.

References

Natural History Museum Lepidoptera generic names catalog

Carposinidae
Monotypic moth genera
Taxa named by Alfred Jefferis Turner
Moths of Australia